Nailed Promise is a Christian metal band from Fort Worth, Texas. The band consists of vocalist and guitarist Nathan Garcia, drummer Matthew Miller, and brothers, guitarist Travis Brown and bassist Ryan Brown. The band signed to Rescue Records, a record label owned by Noah Bernardo Sr. with bands including Point of Recognition, Dogwood, and P.O.D. The band was active from 1994/1995 until 2001-2002.

Members
Current
 Nathan Garcia - Vocals, Guitar
 Travis Brown - Guitar
 Ryan Brown - Bass
 Matthew C. Miller - Drums

Discography
Studio albums
 Life Through Death (1995)
 Realize (1998)

Splits
 Mindrage & Nailed Promise (2001; w/ Mindrage)

Demo
 Demo (1996)
 Jabberwocky

References

External links
 
 

American Christian metal musical groups
Musical groups from Texas
Year of establishment missing